Jennifer Kabura Karina (née: Jennifer Kabura), is a Kenyan businesswoman, "psychologist, certified professional coach, energy leadership practitioner, public speaker and author". Effective July 2021, she serves as the chairperson of the board of directors at the Kenya Reinsurance Corporation (Kenya RE), a publicly traded company on the Nairobi Securities Exchange. Before she was appointed to her current position, she was a member of the board at Kenya RE and chaired the human resources and nominations committee of that board.

Background and education
She was born in Kenya in 1958. Due to her father's employment (he worked in a bank), the family moved around a lot. Eventually they settled in the neighborhood called Ridgeways, in Nairobi, Kenya's capital city. Her mother was a teacher.

She holds a Higher Diploma in Psychological Counselling from the Kenya Institute of Professional Counselling. Her Master of Arts degree in Counseling Psychology was awarded by the Durham University in Durham, United Kingdom. She holds other professional qualifications from Strathmore University and Harvard University. As of May 2022, she was pursuing a Doctor of Philosophy degree in Educational Psychology at Kenyatta University, in Nairobi.

Career
She has worked in various positions and roles, both in the private and public sectors. Her first job, at age 19 years was at Dawa Pharmaceuticals Limited. She was then hired by the representative office in East Africa of Ljubljanska Bank, based in Nairobi, Kenya. She worked there for 17 years, starting in 1982, rising to the position of Operations Manager.

She founded Anchor Relationship Network, a Nairobi-based coaching, mentoring and counselling, psychotherapy consulting firm, where she serves as the "lead coach" (equivalent to a managing partner).

Family
Jennifer Karina is married to Bob Karina and together are parents to three adult children.

Other considerations
She previously served as the Chairperson of Central Bank of Kenya Pension Fund, from 2010 until 2017.
She also chaired the Kenya National Constituency Development Fund Board, from 2008 until 2013. She was the Chief Commissioner of Kenya Girl Guides Association from 2013 until 2019. As of May 2022, she was the Vice Chairperson of the World Association of Girl Guides and Girl Scouts.

See also
 Diana Mulili
 Adema Sangale
 Risper Alaro

References

External links
 Official Website of Kenya Reinsurance Company

Living people
1958 births
20th-century Kenyan businesswomen
20th-century Kenyan businesspeople
Kikuyu people
Kenyan business executives
Alumni of Durham University
Strathmore University alumni
Harvard University alumni
21st-century Kenyan businesswomen
21st-century Kenyan businesspeople